Amakusaplana acroporae, the Acropora-eating flatworm or AEFW, is a species of free-living marine polyclad flatworms in the genus Amakusaplana.

This species preys on the genus Acropora in reef aquariums. These flatworms can grow up to 6 mm and the number of eyes they have increase with body length. They also possess excellent camouflage, hiding on the underside of Acropora coral branches and mimicking the host's color and pigment distribution by extracting fluorescent pigments from the host.

References

External links 

Turbellaria
Fishkeeping
Animals described in 2011